Deroplatys rhombica is a species of praying mantis in the family Deroplatyidae.

See also
 List of mantis genera and species

References

rhombica
Mantodea of Southeast Asia
Insects described in 1897